Tiit Vähi's third cabinet was in office in Estonia from 6 November 1995 to 17 March 1997, when it was succeeded by Mart Siimann's cabinet.

Members

This cabinet's members were the following:
 Tiit Vähi – Prime Minister
 Märt Rask – Minister of Interior Affairs
 Siim Kallas – Minister of Foreign Affairs
 Paul Varul – Minister of Justice
 Andres Lipstok – Minister of Economic Affairs

References

Cabinets of Estonia